The 2003 VCU Rams men's soccer team represented Virginia Commonwealth University during the 2003 NCAA Division I men's soccer season, playing in the Colonial Athletic Association.

The season was one of the most successful season in the program's history, as the Rams won both the CAA regular season and tournament champions successfully defending their titles from 2002. By winning the CAA Tournament, the Rams qualified for NCAA Division I Men's Soccer Championship, for the second straight year and for the sixth time in the program's history. In the NCAA tournament, the Rams advanced to the final sixteen (Regional semifinals), at the time, their deepest run in the tournament.

Team

2010 roster

Coaching staff

Match results
Lists of matches, featuring result, attendance (where available) and scorers, grouped by competition (league, cup, other competition). Do not include friendly matches.

Legend

Home team listed on the right, away team listed on the left. Teams with a "#" sign represents their NSCAA National Ranking at the time of the match.

Regular season

CAA Tournament

NCAA Tournament

References

External links 
2003 Match Reports

VCU Rams men's soccer seasons
Vcu
VCU Rams men's soccer team
Vcu
American soccer clubs 2003 season